Hekluskógar ("Hekla Forest") is a reforesting project in Iceland near the volcano Hekla. The main objective is to reclaim woodlands of native birch and willow to the slopes of Hekla starting with soil fertilisation and grass sowing. This would prevent volcanic ash from blowing over nearby areas after eruption in Hekla and help to reduce wind erosion. It is the largest reforestation of its type in Europe and is estimated to cover 1% of the area of Iceland.

External links
 Official website
 The Hekla Reforest Project
 Forestry in a treeless land

Forestry initiatives
Forests of Iceland
Hekla
Nature conservation in Iceland